Bakening (also known as Bakenin) is a stratovolcano located in the southern part of Kamchatka Peninsula, Russia.

See also
 List of volcanoes in Russia
 List of ultras of Northeast Asia

References

Sources
 
 

Mountains of the Kamchatka Peninsula
Volcanoes of the Kamchatka Peninsula
Stratovolcanoes of Russia
Holocene stratovolcanoes
Holocene Asia
Tuyas
Pleistocene stratovolcanoes